Salsola komarovii is an annual plant native to China, Korea, Japan and eastern Russia. It is cultivated as a vegetable; the leaves and young shoots are eaten. In Japanese it is known as okahijiki which translates as "land seaweed".

References

Amaranthaceae
Leaf vegetables
Barilla plants